Paradise Group Holdings Pte Ltd is a Singapore-based restaurant group incorporated in 2002 by Eldwin Chua,  and Edlan Chua. The company's restaurants serve a variety of Chinese cuisine. Their brands include Seafood Paradise, Paradise Inn, Taste Paradise, Paradise Dynasty, KungFu Paradise, Paradise Pavilion, One Paradise and Canton Paradise. In 2015 the company operates restaurants are currently in Singapore and Malaysia, Indonesia and China.

History
Paradise Group Holdings opened its first restaurant, Seafood Paradise, in 2002 at Defu Lane industrial estate in Singapore. Three more Seafood Paradise outlets were later opened in Singapore.

In 2006, the group opened Taste Paradise in Chinatown and in 2009, it moved to its current location at ION Orchard shopping mall. That year the group launched the first outlet of Paradise Inn at Funan DigitaLife Mall.

In 2010, the group launched One Paradise, their catering arm,  and also Paradise Dynasty, at ION Orchard, serving upscale northern and southern Chinese dishes. Paradise Pavilion also opened in 2010 at Marina Bay Financial Centre, offering Peking duck and modern Chinese cuisine. The Paradise Group also launched KungFu Paradise, an all-day café with both eastern and western dishes aimed at the younger crowd.

In December 2011, Paradise Group embarked on another eatery, Canton Paradise which is a Hong Kong-style eatery offering Cantonese, Shunde cuisine and dim sum.
 
In 2012, Paradise took part in a government-sponsored study designed to improved productivity in the restaurant industry.  The resulting efficiency helped the company double its earnings that year to $50 million.  Also in 2012, the company collaborated with Chaswood Resources to develop restaurants in Thailand.

By 2014, Paradise Group Holdings was operating 34 restaurants, but faced charges in Singapore of tampering with the gas meters at 24 of them.  In spite of this, the company continued to open new restaurants.

In 2015, the group's Malaysian subsidiary opened its first Thai restaurant in Malaysia.

Awards

Entrepreneur of the Year 2011
Singapore Prestige Brand Award 2011
SME1 Asia Awards 2011
Enterprise 50 Award 2011
Epicurean Star Award 2011

References

External links 

 Paradise Group

Restaurants established in 2002
Restaurant chains in Singapore
Singaporean brands